Baseball was contested at the 1935 Central American and Caribbean Games in San Salvador, El Salvador.

References
 

1935 Central American and Caribbean Games
1935
Central American and Caribbean Games